KIDY (channel 6) is a television station in San Angelo, Texas, United States, affiliated with Fox and MyNetworkTV. The station is owned by Tegna Inc., and has studios on South Chadbourne Street in San Angelo; its transmitter is located in rural northwestern Tom Green County (east of Grape Creek). KIDY also handles master control and other internal operations for sister station and fellow Fox affiliate KXVA in Abilene.

History

The station first signed on the air on May 12, 1984, originally operating as an independent station which also carried business news programming from the Financial News Network until 1985. KIDY became a charter affiliate of the then-fledgling Fox Broadcasting Company on October 9, 1986; back then, Fox only carried a late night talk show, The Late Show Starring Joan Rivers. It wasn't until April 5, 1987 when the network expanded its programming to prime time. In the late 1990s, KIDY began branding as "Fox 10," in reference to the station's channel position in the area cable providers (including Suddenlink Communications); the station's branding was changed to "KIDY Fox San Angelo" in 2007. In 2008, KIDY was purchased by Bayou City Broadcasting in a group deal for approximately $3 million.

On September 27, 2012, Bayou City Broadcasting announced an agreement to sell KXVA and its seven other television stations to Dallas-based London Broadcasting Company (the sale price initially was not disclosed). The sale marked a temporary exit from the broadcasting industry for the company's owner DuJuan McCoy, who planned on refocusing his company to acquire major network affiliates in mid-sized markets larger than San Angelo and Abilene. The FCC granted its approval of the sale on November 14. The sale was completed on December 31.

On May 14, 2014, the Gannett Company announced that it would acquire KIDY and five other London Broadcasting stations for $215 million. Gannett CEO Gracia Martore touted that the acquisition would give the company a presence in several fast-growing markets, and opportunities for local advertisers to leverage its digital marketing platform. Both KIDY and Abilene sister station KXVA will be the first Fox affiliates to be owned by Gannett outright; the company had acquired KMSB in Tucson from Belo (as part of a group deal that also included stations in four other Texas markets, Dallas, Houston, Austin and San Antonio) in 2013—however, KMSB is operated by Gray Television (owner of that market's CBS affiliate KOLD-TV) under a shared services agreement that was established in 2012 between Belo and KOLD's then-owner Raycom Media, and Gannett could not directly own the station's license due to newspaper cross-ownership restrictions. The sale was completed on July 8. 13 months later, on June 29, 2015, the Gannett Company split in two, with one side specializing in print media and the other side specializing in broadcast and digital media. KIDY was retained by the latter company, named Tegna.

Programming
KIDY carries the entire Fox network schedule, airing all of the network's programming in pattern. Syndicated programs broadcast by KIDY include The Kelly Clarkson Show, The People's Court, The Big Bang Theory, Modern Family and The Simpsons. Much of KIDY's programming inventory is shared with Abilene sister station KXVA with most programs airing in the same timeslots as those seen on channel 6; as such, KXVA essentially acts as a de facto semi-satellite of KIDY.

News operation
KIDY presently broadcasts 2½ hours of locally produced newscasts each week (with a half-hour on weekdays; the station does not produce newscasts on Saturdays and Sundays). The station originally operated a news department from 1984 until it was shut down in 1988. KIDY would not broadcast news programming again until 2009, with the addition of a simulcast of Fox News at Nine, an hour-long evening newscast from San Antonio Fox affiliate KABB; the newscast aired every night at 9:00 p.m., except in the case of Fox programming overruns due to network sports coverage. The following year in October 2010, the station began simulcasting KABB's four-hour morning newscast, Fox News First; the newscast aired weekday mornings from 5:00 to 9:00 a.m.

In addition to local news headline updates airing during Fox News at Nine and Fox News First, KIDY provides hourly local news updates weekdays between 9:00 a.m. and 7:00 p.m., with headlines and news information provided by the San Angelo Standard-Times newspaper.

On January 20, 2014, KIDY launched a new news department with the debut of a half-hour prime time newscast at 9:30 p.m. on weeknights; the station also produces a half-hour 9:00 p.m. newscast for Abilene sister station KXVA, using the same main anchors as the KIDY broadcast but featuring locally based reporters. All simulcasts of KABB newscasts were dropped with the morning news simulcast being replaced by other programming including The Texas Daily and The Broadcast, news and interview programs produced by its Dallas sister station KTXD-TV.

Subchannels
The station's digital signal is multiplexed:

MyNetworkTV programming is carried on digital subchannel 6.2, which is branded as "My San Angelo".

KIDY's broadcasts became digital-only, effective June 12, 2009.

References

External links
KIDY official website

Television channels and stations established in 1984
IDY
Fox network affiliates
MyNetworkTV affiliates
Cozi TV affiliates
Tegna Inc.
1984 establishments in Texas
Former Gannett subsidiaries